Sangeetha Choodamani is an award bestowed on selected carnatic musicians by Sri Krishna Gana Sabha, Chennai (India) every year. The Sabha conducts a music festival called Gokulashtami Sangeetha Utsavam for 60 days during August - October.

On the inaugural day of the festival, a Carnatic Musician of merit and popularity is honoured with this award that carries a cash award, a gold medallion, a scroll and a shawl.

Recipients of the Award

References

Indian music awards
Carnatic music
1971 establishments in Tamil Nadu
Awards established in 1971